The Honourable Berkeley Thomas Paget (2 January 1780 – 26 October 1842) was a British politician.

Background
Paget was the sixth son of Henry Paget, 1st Earl of Uxbridge, and Jane, daughter of the Very Reverend Arthur Champagné. He was the younger brother of Henry Paget, 1st Marquess of Anglesey, Sir Arthur Paget, Sir Edward Paget and Sir Charles Paget.

Political career
Paget succeeded his elder brother Sir Arthur Paget as Member of Parliament for Anglesey in 1807. In 1810 he was appointed a lord of the treasury by Spencer Perceval, a post he retained when Lord Liverpool became prime minister in 1812 after Perceval's assassination. In 1820 he became Member of Parliament for Milborne Port, succeeding another brother, Sir Edward Paget. He continued to represent this constituency and remained a lord of the treasury until in 1826.

Death
Paget died on 28 October 1842, aged 62, at Hampton Court Palace. He left his property to his wife.

Family

Berkeley married in 1804 Sophia, daughter of the Hon. William Bucknall (earlier William Grimston, MP) and Sophia Hoare, and granddaughter of James Grimston, 2nd Viscount Grimston. She survived him by 17 years, and died in February 1859. They had four sons and three daughters. The children were:

Gertrude Jane, who married the future Standish O'Grady, 2nd Viscount Guillamore.
Frederick, captain in the Coldstream Guards and MP for Beaumaris. He married Maria Georgiana Grenfell.
Eleanor, married in 1825 the future William Jolliffe, 1st Baron Hylton.
Catesby Paget, captain in the 7th Foot, married in 1839 Florinda Frances Mason (died 1842), daughter of Thomas Monck Mason R.N. He subsequently married Adelaide Stapleton, daughter of Miles John Stapleton, who died in 1860; and then Emily Armit, daughter of Richard Armit.
Matilda-Susannah.
Leopold Grimston, a colonel in the Royal Artillery, whose son Wellesley Paget became a brigadier-general in the Royal Artillery. He married Georgiana Theodosia Halsey.
Lennox, died young.

References

External links

1780 births
1842 deaths
Members of the Parliament of the United Kingdom for English constituencies
Members of the Parliament of the United Kingdom for Welsh constituencies
UK MPs 1807–1812
UK MPs 1812–1818
UK MPs 1818–1820
UK MPs 1820–1826
Younger sons of earls
Berkeley